Reformed Dutch Church of Poughkeepsie is a historic church at 70 Hooker Avenue in Poughkeepsie, New York.

The original congregation was formed in 1716. The building was constructed in 1921 and added to the National Register of Historic Places in 2008.

It was designed by Charles Collens.

References

Churches on the National Register of Historic Places in New York (state)
Gothic Revival church buildings in New York (state)
Churches completed in 1921
20th-century Reformed Church in America church buildings
Churches in Dutchess County, New York
Reformed Church in America churches in New York (state)
National Register of Historic Places in Poughkeepsie, New York
1716 establishments in the Province of New York